In Sikhism, the Five Ks are five items that Guru Gobind Singh Ji, in 1699, commanded Khalsa Sikhs to wear at all times. They are: kesh (unshorn hair and beard since the Sikh decided to keep it), kangha (a comb for the kesh, usually wooden), kara (a bracelet, usually made of iron or steel), kachera (an undergarment), and kirpan (a small curved sword of any size, shape or metal).

The Five Ks are not just symbols, but articles of faith that collectively form the external identity and the Khalsa devotee's commitment to the Sikh rehni, 'Sikh way of life'. A Sikh who has taken Amrit and keeps all five Ks are known as Khalsa ('pure') or Amritdhari Sikh ('Amrit Sanskar participant'), while a Sikh who has not taken Amrit but follows the teachings of the Sri Guru Granth Sahib is called a Sahajdhari Sikh.

Kesh

The kesh, also known as kesa, or uncut, long hair, is considered by Sikhs as an indispensable part of the human body. It also emulates the appearance of Guru Gobind Singh and is one of the primary signs by which a Sikh can be clearly and quickly identified. A Sikh never cuts or trims any hair as a symbol of respect for the perfection of God's creation. The uncut long hair and the beard, in the case of men, form the main kakār for Sikhs.

The turban is a spiritual crown, which is a constant reminder to the Sikh that they are sitting on the throne of consciousness and are committed to living according to Sikh principles. Guru Gobind Singh told his Sikhs: 
"Khalsa mero roop hai khaas. Khalsa mai ho karo nivaas... The Khalsa is my image. Within the Khalsa I reside." Wearing a turban declares sovereignty, dedication, self-respect, courage and piety.

A noted figure in Sikh history is Bhai Taru Singh, who was martyred when he refused to get his kesh cut.

Kangha

A kangha is a small wooden comb that Sikhs use twice a day. It is supposed to be worn only in the hair and at all times. Combs help to clean and remove tangles from the hair, and is a symbol of cleanliness. Combing their hair reminds Sikhs that their lives should be tidy and organized.

The comb keeps the hair tidy, a symbol of not just accepting what God has given, but also an injunction to maintain it with grace. The Guru Granth Sahib said hair should be allowed to grow naturally; this precludes any shaving for both men and women. In the Guru's time, some holy men let their hair become tangled and dirty. The Guru said that this was not right; that hair should be allowed to grow but it should be kept clean and combed at least twice a day.

Kara

The Sikhs were commanded by Guru Gobind Singh at the Baisakhi Amrit Sanchar in 1699 to wear an iron bracelet called a Kara at all times. The kara is a constant reminder that whatever a person does with their hands has to be in keeping with the advice given by the Guru. The kara is an iron/steel circle to symbolise God as never-ending. It is a symbol of permanent bonding to the community, of being a link in the chain of Khalsa Sikhs (the word for link is kari).

Kachera

The kachera is a shalwar-underwear with a tie-knot worn by baptised Sikhs. Originally, the kachera was made part of the five Ks as a symbol of a Sikh soldier's willingness to be ready at a moment's notice for battle or for defence. The confirmed Sikh (one who has taken the Amrit) wears a kachera every day. Some go to the extent of wearing a kacheraye while bathing, to be ready to at a moment's notice, changing into the new one a single leg at a time, so as to have no moment where they are unprepared. Further, this garment allowed the Sikh soldier to operate in combat freely and without any hindrance or restriction, because it was easy to fabricate, maintain, wash and carry compared to other traditional under-garments of that era, like the dhoti. The kachera symbolises self-respect, and always reminds the wearer of mental control over lust, one of the Five Evils in Sikh philosophy.

Kachera follow a generally practical and roomy design.  It features an embedded string that circles the waist which can be tightened or loosened as desired, and then knotted securely.  The kachera can be classed between underwear and an outer garment, as in appearance it does not reveal private anatomy, and looks and wears like shorts.  As with all of the Five Ks, there is equality between men and women, and so women are also expected to wear it.  Considering the hot climate in India, the kachera is often worn by men as an outer garment, keeping the wearer cool and being practical in manual work such as farming, but it is generally not considered respectful for women to wear the kachera as an outer garment (on its own) as it is considered too revealing.

Kirpan

The kirpan is a dagger which symbolises a Sikh's duty to come to the defence of those in peril. All Sikhs should wear the kirpan on their body at all times as a defensive side-arm, just as a police officer is expected to wear a side-arm when on duty.  Its use is only allowed in the act of self-defense and the protection of others.  It stands for bravery and protecting the weak and innocent. 
 
The kirpan is kept sharp and is actually used to defend others, such as those who are oppressed by harsh rulers, or a person who is being robbed, raped, or beaten. The true Sikh cannot turn a blind eye to such evils, thinking that they are "someone else's concern." It is the duty of the true Sikh to help those who suffer unjustly, by whatever means available, whether that means alerting the police, summoning help, or defending those who cannot defend themselves, even if that means putting oneself in harm's way.

Panj Kapde 
The Five Ks are the bare minimum and are not the full extent of Khalsa uniform; the Panj Kapde is also part of Khalsa uniform. It is part of the tradition of panj kapare (five garments), comprising dastaar (turban), hazooria (long white scarf worn around the neck), long chola (dress), kamar-kasaa (material tied around the waist like a belt) and kacchera (under-garment). Reference to this has been made by Varan Bhai Gurdas as well. The dastaar and kachera are mandatory for Sikhs although more spiritual Sikhs also have the other kapde.

Dastaar 
A dastār (Punjabi: ,) which derives from dast-e-yār or 'the hand of God', is an item of headwear associated with Sikhism, and is an important part of Sikh culture. The word is loaned from Persian through Punjabi. In Persian, the word dastār can refer to any kind of turban and replaced the original word for turban, dolband, from which the English word is derived.

Among the Sikhs, the dastār is an article of faith that represents equality, honour, self-respect, courage, spirituality, and piety. The Khalsa Sikh men and women, who keep the Five Ks, wear the turban to cover their long, uncut hair (kesh). The Sikhs regard the dastār as an important part of the unique Sikh identity. After the ninth Sikh Guru, Tegh Bahadur, was sentenced to death by the Mughal emperor Aurangzeb, Guru Gobind Singh, the tenth Sikh Guru created the Khalsa and gave five articles of faith, one of which is unshorn hair, which the dastār covers.

Sikh chola 
Sikh chola is traditional dress worn by Sikhs. It is a martial attire which gives freedom of movement to a Sikh warrior. Sikh chola is also unisex attire, and may also be decorated with heavy embroidery all over it. It is meant to be either yellow, white or electric blue with many pockets to hold matchlocks and other weapons.

Kamar kasa 
Kamar kasa is a sash bound around the waist to hold weapons an essential part of Nihang (Sikh warrior) dress. It is also called cumberband, belt, waist sash, or waistband. The Kamar kasa is meant to be yellow if wearing a blue chola or blue if wearing a white chola.

Hazooria 

A hazooria (scarf) is a sign of humility which is grasped during the Ardās. It is a constant reminder of surrendering one's mind to the Guru, along with the five K's. A hazooria is practical: it helps one keep suchamta (cleanliness) during seva (service) or reading Gurbani (hymns). It can help keep the hands clean when touching the face or picking up objects. The hazooria was also worn by servants and symbolises the Sikh surrendering to Waheguruji as their master.

See also 
 Sikhism
 Amrit Sanchar 
 Vaisakhi
 Khalsa and Sir-Gums
 Gursikh
 Amritdhari

References

External links
 The Five Sikh Symbols – SikhismGuide.org
 The Sikh Symbols – eBook
 The Sikh Bangle (Kara) – eBook
 http://www.tandfonline.com/doi/full/10.1080/17448727.2014.882181

Sikh practices
Sikh religious clothing